TPC Michigan is a private golf club located in Dearborn, Michigan and owned by ClubCorp.

The Jack Nicklaus designed championship golf course is a member of the Tournament Players Club network, which is operated by the PGA Tour. In 2007, the facility was sold to the Heritage Golf Group, but retained its TPC branding under a licensing agreement. In April 2014, TPC Michigan was sold to ClubCorp.

Between 1991 and 2006 TPC Michigan hosted the Ford Senior Players Championship, a Champions Tour event and one of senior men's golf's major championships.

References

External links
Official site

Dearborn, Michigan
Golf clubs and courses in Michigan
Sports venues in Wayne County, Michigan
Sports venues completed in 1990
1990 establishments in Michigan